The Criminal Law Act 1977 (c.45) is an Act of the Parliament of the United Kingdom. Most of it only applies to England and Wales. It creates the offence of conspiracy in English law. It also created offences concerned with criminal trespass in premises, made changes to sentencing, and created an offence of falsely reporting the existence of a bomb.

Main provisions

Part I - Conspiracy

Part II - Offences relating to entering and remaining on property
This Part implemented recommendations contained in the Report on Conspiracy and Criminal Law Reform (Law Com 76) by the Law Commission.

Section 6 - Violence for securing entry
Section 6 creates an offence of using or threatening unauthorised violence for the purpose of securing entry into any premises, while there is known to be a person inside opposing entry. Violence is taken to include violence to property, as well as to people.

This section has been widely used by squatters in England and Wales, as it makes it a crime in most circumstances for the landlord to force entry, as long as the squatters are physically present and express opposition to the landlord's entry. "Squatters rights" do not apply when the property appears to be occupied (e.g. there are signs of current use, furniture, etc.).

Section 6 is referred to in printed legal warnings, which are commonly displayed near the entrances to squatted buildings. Squatters are not protected by the Protection from Eviction Act 1977, which makes it a crime to evict tenants without following the legal process.

Reasonable force used by a bailiff executing a possession order would not be considered unauthorised violence, so landlords can still legally regain possession through the courts.

Laws regarding squatting residential properties were revised in the Legal Aid, Sentencing and Punishment of Offenders Act 2012.

Section 7 - Adverse occupation of residential premises
Section 8 - Trespassing with a weapon of offence

Section 9 - Trespassing on the premises of foreign missions etc
The purpose of this offence is to fill the lacuna that might otherwise have been left in the law by the abolition of the common law offence of conspiracy to trespass by section 5(1) of the Act.

Section 10 - Obstruction of court officers executing process for possession against unauthorised occupiers
Section 11 - Power of entry for the purpose of Part II of the Act
Section 12 - Supplementary provisions

Section 13 - Abolitions and repeals
This section abolished existing offences and repealed earlier statutes that were superseded by Part II of the Act.

Subsection (1) abolished the common law offence of forcible entry and any offence at common law of forcible detainer.

Subsection (2) repealed:
The Forcible Entry Act 1381
15 Ric 2 c 2
The Forcible Entry Act 1429
The Forcible Entry Act 1588
The Forcible Entry Act 1623

Part III - Criminal procedure, penalties etc
This Part implemented recommendations contained in the Report of the Interdepartmental Committee on the Distribution of Criminal Business between the Crown Court and Magistrates' Courts (Cmnd 6323) (1975).

Section 14 - Preliminary
This section provided that sections 15 to 24 had effect for the purpose of securing that, as regards mode of trial, there were only three classes of offence, namely offences triable only on indictment, offences triable only summarily and offences triable either way, for laying down a single procedure applicable to all cases where a person who had attained the age of seventeen appeared or was brought before a magistrates' court on an information charging him with an offence triable either way, and for related purposes.

Section 15 - Offences which are to become triable only summarily

Section 16 - Offences which are to become triable either way
Subsection (2) replaced section 19 of the Magistrates' Courts Act 1952. This section was replaced by section 17 of the Magistrates' Courts Act 1980.

Section 17 - Offence which is to become triable only on indictment
This section made the offence of criminal libel triable only on indictment. It did this by repealing section 5 of the Newspaper Libel and Registration Act 1881. It was repealed by the Statute Law (Repeals) Act 1993 because it was spent by virtue of section 15 of the Interpretation Act 1978.

Section 18 - Provisions as to time limits on summary proceedings for indictable offences
Section 19 - Initial procedure on information for offence triable either way
Section 20 - Court to begin by considering which mode of trial appears more suitable
Section 21 - Procedure where summary trial appears more suitable
Section 22 - Procedure where trial on indictment appears more suitable
Section 23 - Certain offences triable either way to be tried summarily if the value involved is small
Section 24 - Power of court, with consent of legally represented accused, to proceed in his absence
Section 25 - Power to change from summary trial to committal proceedings, and vice versa
Section 26 - Power to issue summons to accused in certain circumstances
Section 27 - General limit on power of magistrates' court to impose imprisonment
Section 28 - Penalties on summary conviction for offences triable either way
Section 29 - Maximum penalties on summary conviction in pursuance of section 23
Section 30 - Penalties and mode of trial for offences made triable only summarily
Section 31 - Increase of fines for certain summary offences
Section 32 - Other provisions as to maximum fines
Section 33 - Penalty for offences under section 3 of the Explosive Substances Act 1883
Section 34 - Power of magistrates' court to remit a person under 17 for trial to a juvenile court in certain circumstances
Section 35 - Power to commit a person under 17 for trial extended to related offences in certain cases
Section 36 - Enforcement of fines imposed on young offenders
Section 37 - Supervision orders
Section 38 - Execution throughout United Kingdom of warrants of arrest
Section 39 - Service of summonses and citation throughout the United Kingdom
Section 40 - Transfer of fine orders
Section 41 - Transfer of remand hearings
Section 42 - Remand of accused already in custody
Section 43 - Peremptory challenge of jurors
Section 44 - Appeals against conviction
Section 45 - Cases where magistrates' Court may remit offender to another such court for sentence
Section 46 - Committal for sentence of offences tried summarily
Section 47 - Prison sentence partly served and partly suspended
Section 48 - Power to make rules as to furnishing of information by prosecutor in criminal proceedings
Section 49 - Power to order the search of persons before the Crown Court

Part IV - Miscellaneous provisions

Section 50 - Amendment of the Road Traffic Act 1972
This section abolished the offences of causing death by dangerous driving, dangerous driving and dangerous cycling (whilst re-enacting those parts of the same provisions that referred to reckless driving and cycling).

Subsection (1) substituted sections 1 and 2 of the Road Traffic Act 1972. Subsection (2) substituted section 17 of that Act.

Section 51 - Bomb hoaxes
This section creates an offence of bomb hoaxes.

Section 52 - Misuse of Drugs Act 1971: redefinition of cannabis
This section substitutes the definition of cannabis in section 37(1) of the Misuse of Drugs Act 1971 so that it includes leaves and stalks of the plant other than mature stalk separated from the rest of the plant. It was enacted in response to the successful appeal in R v Goodchild [1977] 2 All ER 163, [1977] 1 WLR 473 for the possession of dried leaves and stalks of the plant containing cannabis resin because these could not be described as "flowering and fruiting tops" of the plant and therefore did not fall within the definition then provided.

Section 53 - Amendments of the Obscene Publications Act 1959 with respect to cinematograph exhibitions

This section amends the Obscene Publications Act 1959.

Section 54 - Inciting girl under sixteen to have incestuous sexual intercourse

See incitement.

Section 55 - Amendment of the Rabies Act 1974 and the Diseases of Animals (Northern Ireland) Order 1975
This section amends the Rabies Act 1974 and the Diseases of Animals (Northern Ireland) Order 1975.

Section 56 - Coroners inquests
This section implemented recommendations contained in the Report of the Committee on Death Certificates and Coroners (Cmnd 4810) (1971).

Subsection (3) substituted section 20 of the Coroners (Amendment) Act 1926. Subsection 4 repealed the City of London Fire Inquests Act 1888.

Section 57 - Probation and conditional discharge: power to vary statutory minimum or maximum period

This section amended the Powers of Criminal Courts Act 1973.

Section 58 - Proceedings involving persons under 17: increase of certain pecuniary limits
This section amended section 8(3) of the Criminal Justice Act 1961 and the Children and Young Persons Act 1969.

Section 59 - Alteration of maximum periods in default of payments of fines etc
This section substituted paragraph 1 of Schedule 3 to the Magistrates' Courts Act 1952.

Section 60 - Increase in maximum amount of compensation which may be awarded by a magistrates' court
This section amended section 35(5) of the Powers of the Criminal Courts Act 1973.

Part V
Section 63 applies to Scotland

Part VI - Supplementary

Section 65 - Citation, etc.
The following orders have been made under section 65(7):
The Criminal Law Act 1977 (Commencement No. 1) Order 1977 (S.I. 1977/1365 (C. 47))
The Criminal Law Act 1977 (Commencement No. 2) Order 1977 (S.I. 1977/1426 (C. 51))
The Criminal Law Act 1977 (Commencement No. 3) Order 1977 (S.I. 1977/1682 (C. 58))
The Criminal Law Act 1977 (Commencement No. 5) Order 1978 (S.I. 1978/712 (C. 16))
The Criminal Law Act 1977 (Commencement No. 7) Order 1980 (S.I. 1980/487 (C. 17))
The Criminal Law Act 1977 (Commencement No. 9) Order 1980 (S.I. 1980/1632 (C. 69)
The Criminal Law Act 1977 (Commencement No. 11) Order 1982 (S.I. 1982/243 (C. 9))
The Criminal Law Act 1977 (Commencement No. 12) Order 1985 (S.I. 1985/579 (C. 8))

See also
Criminal Law Act

References

External links
The Criminal Law Act 1977, as amended, from the National Archives.

United Kingdom Acts of Parliament 1977
Criminal law of the United Kingdom